Jared du Toit (born 22 May 1995) is a Canadian professional golfer.

Du Toit played college golf at the University of Idaho for two years before transferring to Arizona State University.

At the 2016 RBC Canadian Open, du Toit was one stroke behind the leader Brandt Snedeker after 54 holes. This allowed him to play with Snedeker in the final pairing for the final round. He finished T9 and was the top Canadian and top amateur in the event. This was only his second professional event, the first being the SIGA Dakota Dunes Open on PGA Tour Canada. Du Toit improved to 25th in the World Amateur Golf Ranking with his finish and was the top ranked Canadian male amateur golfer. He entered his senior year at ASU in September 2016.

In May 2017, Du Toit announced his decision to turn pro.

Amateur wins
2013 British Columbia Junior Championship
2014 University of Wyoming Southern
2015 Big Sky Conference Championship, British Columbia Amateur
2016 Glencoe Invitational
2017 The Prestige at PGA West
Source:

Professional wins (1)

PGA Tour Canada wins (1)

Team appearances
Amateur
Eisenhower Trophy (representing Canada): 2016

References

External links

Canadian male golfers
Idaho Vandals men's golfers
Arizona State Sun Devils men's golfers
Golfing people from Alberta
Golfing people from British Columbia
Sportspeople from Calgary
People from the Regional District of East Kootenay
1995 births
Living people